Urs Steinmann is a former Swiss slalom canoeist who competed in the 1980s. He won a silver medal in the K-1 team event at the 1981 ICF Canoe Slalom World Championships in Bala.

References

Swiss male canoeists
Living people
Year of birth missing (living people)
Medalists at the ICF Canoe Slalom World Championships